Inverness Corona is a corona, located at 66.9° S, 325.7 ° E in the southern hemisphere of Miranda, a moon of Uranus. This feature is named for the location of Macbeth's castle, Inverness. The area was first examined closely by spacecraft Voyager 2 in 1986.

References

External links
 - includes the prominent features of Corona and Alonso
 (repeat of the 1999 APOD)

Miranda (moon)